Allium togashii is a plant species endemic to Japan. It is known only from Shikoku: Kankakei, and Azuki, although it is cultivated in other counties for its attractive floral arrays. It is a small, delicate plant with thin scapes and a feathery-looking umbel of very pale lavender flowers.

References

togashii
Onions
Flora of Japan
Endemic flora of Japan
Plants described in 1953